Ohio Theatre or Ohio Theater may refer to:

On the National Register of Historic Places:
 Ohio Theatre (Cleveland, Ohio), part of the Playhouse Square Center, Cleveland, Ohio
 Ohio Theatre (Columbus, Ohio)
 Ohio Theatre (Lima, Ohio)
Ohio Theatre (Loudonville, Ohio)
 Ohio Theatre (Toledo, Ohio)
 Renaissance Theatre (Mansfield, Ohio), originally called the Ohio Theatre
 New Ohio Theatre, New York City